Alle gaar rundt og forelsker sig is a Danish 1941  Operetta film directed by Emanuel Gregers. The film was produced by Nordisk Film.

Plot 
It is a bet that sets the action in motion. In the Central Theatre's corduroy wardrobe, an extremely lively discussion arises one evening between the beautiful and energetic Mette Madsen and her comrades. The girls have, as usual, discussed the problem with men, and Oda, a beautiful girl, full of sex appeal, claims that Mette, who by the way is an excellent chairman of the Kordamers' organization, is completely devoid of "oomph" and does not exercise any attraction to men. The bet is made and the three "victims", who must of course be unmarried, are chosen from the phone book.

Cast 
 Lilian Ellis – Mette Madsen
 Erika Voigt – Mette's mother, Cordelia
 Hans Kurt – Frits Olsen
 Valdemar Møller – F. Olsen (Frits' father)
 Peter Malberg – Ludvig Bøgholm
 Erling Schroeder – Erik Sommer
 Sigurd Langberg – Mr. Sommer (Erik's father)
 Sigrid Horne-Rasmussen – Oda Holm
 Svend Bille – Theatre director Holgersen
 Petrine Sonne – Johanne Mikkelsen
 Paul Holck Hofmann – Regissør
 Marie Niedermann – Gormsen
 Minna Jørgensen – Frk. Storm
 Clara Schwartz – Fru Sommer
 Asta Hansen – Vera
 Lillian Forum-Hansen – Korpige
 Jeanne Darville – Korpige
 Tudlik Johansen – Korpige
 Victor Cornelius – Sanger
 Gudrun Ringheim – Korpige
 Else Kordt – Kordt Sisters
 Inga Kordt – Kordt Sisters
 Grete Kordt – Kordt Sisters
 Lisa Haidt – Sangerinde i starten, korpige
 Sonja Steincke  Sangerinde i starten, korpige
 Maj Dam – Korpige
 Valsø Holm – Sporvognspassager
 Ruth Saabye – Korpige
 Gunnar Bigum – Gæst i teaterkatten der truer Frits
 Henry Nielsen – Receptionist
 Asta Esper Andersen – Sporvognspassager
 Ejner Bjørkmann – Tubaspiller i sporvogn
 Kay Abrahamsen – Mettes sangpartner
 Gunnar Strømvad – Dansende gæst i Teaterkatten
 Eik Koch – Dansende gæst i Teaterkatten

Music 
The title song Alle går rundt og forelsker sig, with lyrics by Børge Müller, was one of a group of 12 songs by Kai Normann Andersen that was included in the Danish Culture Canon.

References

External links 
 
 
 

1941 films
Danish musical films
1940s Danish-language films
1941 musical films
Operetta films
Danish black-and-white films